Alexandre Romero (born June 25, 1985) is a former American football placekicker. He was signed by the New Orleans VooDoo as a free agent in 2008. He played college football at Nicholls State University.

Romero has also been a member of the San Francisco 49ers.

References
  Nicholls State Colonels media guide

External links
 Nicholls Colonels bio
 San Francisco 49ers bio
 NFL bio

1985 births
Living people
Players of American football from New Orleans
American football placekickers
Nicholls Colonels football players
New Orleans VooDoo players
San Francisco 49ers players